The 1952 U.S. National Championships (now known as the US Open) was a tennis tournament that took place on the outdoor grass courts at the West Side Tennis Club, Forest Hills in New York City, United States. The tournament ran from 29 August until 8 September. It was the 72nd staging of the U.S. National Championships, and the fourth Grand Slam tennis event of the year.

Finals

Men's singles

 Frank Sedgman defeated  Gardnar Mulloy  6–1, 6–2, 6–3

Women's singles

 Maureen Connolly defeated  Doris Hart  6–3, 7–5

Men's doubles
 Mervyn Rose /  Vic Seixas defeated  Ken McGregor /  Frank Sedgman 3–6, 10–8, 10–8, 6–8, 8–6

Women's doubles
 Shirley Fry /  Doris Hart defeated  Louise Brough /  Maureen Connolly 10–8, 6–4

Mixed doubles
 Doris Hart /   Frank Sedgman defeated  Thelma Coyne Long /  Lew Hoad 6–3, 7–5

References

External links
Official US Open website

 
U.S. National Championships
U.S. National Championships (tennis) by year
U.S. National Championships
U.S. National Championships
U.S. National Championships
U.S. National Championships